Alison Elizabeth Kent (born 13 November 1960) is a member of the Western Australian Legislative Assembly for the electoral district of Kalgoorlie for the Australian Labor Party. She won her seat at the 2021 Western Australian state election with an 18.9% swing against the incumbent Liberal Party candidate.

Prior to her election, Kent was the president of the Goldfields Women's Health Care Centre.

References 

Living people
1960 births 
Australian Labor Party members of the Parliament of Western Australia
Members of the Western Australian Legislative Assembly
Women members of the Western Australian Legislative Assembly
21st-century Australian politicians
21st-century Australian women politicians